Ross Gerald Gregory (27 February 1916 – 10 June 1942) was an Australian Test cricketer.

Gregory, a diminutive gifted right-hand batsman, was a precocious batting talent, making his debut for Victoria while still at school and his Test cricket debut before the age of 21 in the 1936–37 season, after scoring 128 for his state against Gubby Allen's MCC tourists.  Although this was his only first-class century, he scored 17 fifties in his 33 games and took 50 wickets with his leg breaks and googlies.  He compiled 23, 50 and 80 in his three Test innings, making a major contribution as Australia came back from 2-0 down to win the Ashes 3–2.

During the Second World War, Gregory enlisted in the Royal Australian Air Force and attained the rank of Pilot Officer. He was killed in action near the town of Gaffargaon, East Bengal (now Bangladesh) in 1942 (aged 26) when his bomber crashed on operations to bomb Japanese in Burma.

Born in Malvern, a suburb of Melbourne, he was educated at Wesley College, Melbourne.

Notes

References

External links 

Roll of honour – Australian War Memorial

1916 births
1942 deaths
Victoria cricketers
Australia Test cricketers
Australian military personnel killed in World War II
Australian World War II pilots
Royal Australian Air Force personnel of World War II
Cricketers from Melbourne
People educated at Wesley College (Victoria)
Australian cricketers
D. G. Bradman's XI cricketers
Royal Australian Air Force officers
People from Malvern, Victoria
Military personnel from Melbourne